Alan Arthur Wells (1 May 1924 – 8 November 2005) was a British structural engineer.

Early life
He was born in Goff's Oak, Hertfordshire to Arthur John Wells, a British Oxygen Company engineer and educated at the City of London School as a day boy. He left school in 1940 to become an apprentice fitter and studied for a London University external degree via day release and weekend classes. He was awarded an intermediate B.Sc. in 1941 at the age of 17. After two years at Nottingham University College he was awarded an honours degree in Engineering, 2nd Class.

He had married Rosemary Mitchell in June 1950.

Honours and awards
 1942 Bayliss Prize, Institution of Civil Engineers
 1946 Miller Prize, Institution of Civil Engineers
 1955 President’s Gold Medal, Society of Engineers
 1956 Premium Award, Royal Institution of Naval Architects
 1964 Houdremont Lecture, International Institute of Welding
 1966 Hadfield Medal, Iron and Steel Institute
 1968 Larke Medal, Institute of Welding
 1969 Honorary Fellow, Institute of Welding
 1973 Honorary Doctorate, Ghent University
 1975 Member, Royal Irish Academy
 1977 Fellow of the Royal Society of London 
 1979 Fellow, Royal Academy of Engineering
 1982 Rupert H. Myers Award, University of New South Wales
 1982 Officer, Order of the British Empire
 1982 DSc (honoris causa), University of Glasgow
 1983 Ludwig Tetmajer Award, Technical University of Vienna
 1984 Freedom of the City of London
 1986 DSc (honoris causa), Queen’s University Belfast
 1986 Platinum Medal, Institute of Metals
 1987 Edstrom Medal, International Institute of Welding
 1994 The Esso Medal, Royal Society
 1994 Yoshiaki Arata Award, International Institute of Welding
 1999 Honorary Fellowship, Institution of Mechanical Engineers
 2003 Named for Professional Members Building and Library at the TWI, Abington

References

1924 births
2005 deaths
People from Goffs Oak
British structural engineers
Fellows of the Royal Society